The Shayrat and Tiyas airbase ambush was an armed attack on Shayrat Airbase and the Tiyas Military Airbase in the Homs Governorate by the Free Syrian Army on 25 November 2011, during the Syrian Civil War. Ten Syrian Air Force personnel were killed.

The attack
On the morning of 25 November 2011, members of the Free Syrian Army, composed mostly of regular Syrian army defectors, attacked a bus which was carrying pilots and other air force personnel. Scramble.nl indicated that possible locations of the attack were the Shayrat and Tiyas airbases. Ten Syrian Air Force personnel were killed, including "six elite military pilots", one technical officer and three other base personnel.

The Syrian military confirmed that the ambush had taken place. A spokesman on state television said that "an armed terrorist group undertook an evil assassination plot that martyred six pilots, a technical officer and three other personnel on an air force base between Homs and Palmyra." The spokesman vowed revenge and claimed the attack was proof of foreign involvement in the uprising.

The Free Syrian Army claimed seven military pilots were killed in the ambush.

References

Military operations of the Syrian civil war in 2011
Homs Governorate in the Syrian civil war
November 2011 events in Syria
Ambushes